Micheline Coulibaly (1950 – 19 March 2003) was a writer from Côte d'Ivoire. She was born in Vietnam but went to school in Côte d'Ivoire. In 1990, she moved to Mexico, in 2000 to Dubai. She wrote short stories and children's books. Coulibaly came from a big family (Tra-Bi).

Publications
Collision, Edilis, 1992 (144p.), 
Crystal Tears, Edilis, 2000 (300p.),

External links
Biography

1950 births
2003 deaths
Ivorian short story writers
Ivorian women writers
Ivorian women short story writers